This is a list of individuals who have been the targets of assassination by the United States. American authorities usually define these killings as 'targeted killings'.

Successful assassinations

Failed attempts

Planned but unexecuted assassinations

See also 
Drone strike
Assassination and targeted killing by the CIA
List of assassinations
List of Israeli assassinations
List of Iranian assassinations 
List of Soviet and Russian assassinations
United States involvement in regime change
Criticism of United States foreign policy
Operation Condor

References 

Assassinations by the United States
United States